St. Andrew's Church in Lahore, Pakistan, was built by the British in 1872, for the Christian employees of the Railways, in the Neo-Gothic style of architecture that was prevalent at the time. The present Vicar Revd. Dr. Irshad John joined the St Andrew's Church in 1991 and since then he was attached to Diocese of Lahore and Presently serving as Vicar of this Church. His vision and aim for this Church is to provide a platform to upcoming youngsters to make them confident to be the Future leader for our community.

Location
It was built near the Lahore Railway Station and Railways Headquarters. It is also known as the St Andrews Railway Church. Revd. Dr. Irshad John along with the congregation was able to make two more parishes (Outreach) from this Church one is in Youhanabad Known as Christ Church, Other is in Mianmir Colony know as St Johns Church and the last one is in Muhgalpura Lahore known as St Oswalds Church.

Revd. Dr. Irshad John
The present Vicar St Andrew's Church joined the Lahore Diocese in 1991 before that he was working in his home town Sahiwal in Mission Hospital Sahiwal. The Reverend Dr. Irshad John completed his Theological training from St Thomas Theological Seminary in Karachi Pakistan, after completing his training he joined Lahore Diocese as Deacon and form then after he was promoted to Vicar St Andrew's Church.

References

Churches completed in 1899
19th-century Roman Catholic church buildings
Roman Catholic churches in Lahore
Roman Catholic churches completed in 1899
1899 establishments in British India